is a district located in Gifu Prefecture, Japan.

As of July 2011, the district has an estimated population of 36,426. The total area is 106.43 km2.

Towns and villages
Sekigahara
Tarui

References

Districts in Gifu Prefecture